A sleeve coupling is a basic type of coupling. This consists of a pipe whose bore is finished to the required tolerance based on the shaft size. Based on the usage of the coupling a keyway is made in the bore in order to transmit the torque by means of the key. Two threaded holes are provided in order to lock the coupling in position.

Sleeve couplings are also known as box couplings. In this case shaft ends are coupled together and abutted against each other which are enveloped by muff or sleeve. A gib head sunk keys hold the two shafts and sleeve together

Rotating shaft couplings